Pere Gimferrer (born 22 June 1945) is a Spanish poet, translator and novelist. He is twice winner of Spain's Premio Nacional de Poesía (National Poetry Prize).

He was born in Barcelona in 1945. He writes both in Castilian and Catalan. In Castilian, he has written the poetry collections Arde el mar (1966, National Prize for Poetry), Amor en vilo (2006), Interludio azul (2006) and Tornado (2008). In Catalan, he has written the novel Fortuny (1983, Ramon Llull Novel Award and Critica Prize), and the poetry collection El vendaval (1988, National Poetry Prize). For lifetime achievement, he won the Premio Nacional de las Letras Españolas (National Prize for Spanish Literature) in 1998 and the International Octavio Paz Prize for Poetry and Criticism in 2006.

Gimferrer was elected to Seat O of the Real Academia Española on 18 April 1985, he took up his seat on 15 December the same year.

References

External links
 
 Àlbum Pere Gimferrer A web page that explores the poetics of Pere Gimferrer's many voices and personalities

Writers from Barcelona
1945 births
20th-century Spanish poets
20th-century Spanish male writers
Poets from Catalonia
Catalan-language poets
Catalan-language writers
Living people
Novelists from Catalonia
Translators from Catalonia
20th-century Spanish novelists
21st-century Spanish novelists
Spanish male novelists
Translators to Catalan
Spanish male poets
Members of the Royal Spanish Academy
21st-century Spanish poets
21st-century Spanish male writers